Fernando Alfredo Kanapkis García (born 6 June 1966) is a Uruguayan retired footballer who played as a defender. He was part of Uruguay national team at 1993 Copa América.

Career statistics

International

References

External links
 
  Profile

1966 births
Living people
Footballers from Montevideo
Association football defenders
Uruguayan people of Greek descent
Uruguayan people of Spanish descent
Uruguayan footballers
Uruguay international footballers
Centro Atlético Fénix players
Danubio F.C. players
Textil Mandiyú footballers
Clube Atlético Mineiro players
Club Nacional de Football players
Rampla Juniors players
Racing Club de Montevideo players
1993 Copa América players
Uruguayan expatriate footballers
Expatriate footballers in Brazil
Expatriate footballers in Argentina